Kihlstrom (sometimes spelled Kihlström) is a surname. Notable people with this surname include:
April Kihlstrom, American novelist
Dan Kihlström (born 1957), Swedish politician
John Kihlstrom (born 1948), American psychologist
Mats Kihlström (born 1964), Swedish hockey player
Thomas Kihlström (born 1948), Swedish badminton player